U.S. Route 127  (US 127) is a  north–south U.S. Highway in the eastern half of the United States. The southern terminus of the route is at US 27 in Chattanooga, Tennessee. The northern terminus is at Interstate 75 (I-75) near Grayling, Michigan. Since 1987, it has been the core of the annual World's Longest Yard Sale, also known as the Highway 127 Corridor Sale (127 Yard Sale),  which now stretches  from Addison, Michigan, to Gadsden, Alabama. The sale, held every August, was started to demonstrate that the older U.S. Highway System has something to offer that the Interstate Highway System does not. In Michigan, US 127 tripled in length in 2002, taking mileage from its parent, US 27.

Route description

|-
|TN
|
|-
|KY
|
|-
|OH
|
|-
|MI
|
|-
|Total
|
|}

Tennessee

In Tennessee, US 127 traverses rural areas of the Cumberland Plateau in eastern Middle Tennessee and western East Tennessee. The route officially begins in the northern Chattanooga suburb of Red Bank at an interchange with US 27, where it overlaps Tennessee State Route 8. From there it runs primarily northwest as it passes Signal Mountain, and later Walden Ridge before entering Dunlap, where it turns northeast along Tennessee State Route 28. After TN 8 leaves at the interchange with TN 111, US 127/TN 28 follows through the Sequatchie Valley, passing through the city of Pikeville, then curves back to the northwest as it enters Crossville, only to return towards the northeast as it enters Jamestown. From that point on it returns towards the northwest one more time as it winds through the woods surrounding the Sgt. Alvin C. York State Historic Park. Finally in Static, the road runs along the Tennessee-Kentucky border where it makes a sharp turn at the northern terminus of TN 111 before entering Kentucky.

Kentucky

This was the road driven by Buddy Rich when he wrote "Blue Grass makes me Blue" in 1947. At the state capital of Frankfort, it becomes a four-lane highway, then skirts Lawrenceburg, Harrodsburg, and Danville. It enters the hilly Knobs Region at Junction City, where it becomes a two-lane route, and continues through Hustonville, crossing the drainage divide between the Kentucky and Green river watersheds and roughly following the scenic upper Green River valley through Casey County, crossing the river at Liberty. South of Dunnville it climbs onto the Eastern Pennyroyal Plateau and cuts through Russell Springs and Jamestown. It crosses Wolf Creek Dam, which creates Lake Cumberland. It runs very briefly with KY 90 north of Albany and crosses into Tennessee at Static. The new route through Clinton County includes a bypass west of Albany; the original plan for a more direct eastern route was abandoned because of historic and scenic concerns. In the county US 127 runs through sinkhole plains along the escarpment that marks the western edge of the Cumberland Plateau, creating scenic views.

Ohio

US 127 serves several cities and rural communities along the extreme western edge of Ohio, including Cincinnati,  New Miami,  Seven Mile, Somerville, Camden, Eaton, Greenville, Celina, Van Wert, Paulding and Bryan. In Cincinnati, it shares a short concurrency with its parent route, US 27, along with US 42. From there, it heads north through Fairfield and Hamilton. The highway is a four-lane, divided bypass around Greenville. US 127 crosses the Ohio Turnpike near West Unity, but does not intersect with it. The first city US 127 enters after leaving Kentucky is Cincinnati. The last municipality that US 127 goes through before reaching Michigan is West Unity.

Except for Defiance County, US 127 passes through the county seats of all nine counties in Ohio that share a border with Indiana. It also traverses a portion of Fulton County before entering Michigan.

Michigan

The highway is the primary route connecting Lansing and central Michigan to Northern Michigan and the Mackinac Bridge; it serves the cities of Jackson, Lansing, and Clare.  From the south side of Jackson northerly, it is mostly a four-lane freeway, except for the notable exception of a  stretch from north of St. Johns to just south of Ithaca, where access to the road is not limited.

From the Ohio border until Jackson, the highway follows the course (with minor deviations) of the Michigan Meridian used to survey Michigan in the early 19th century. That stretch is generally named Meridian Road.
In the non-freeway sections of the route, it is known as Bagley Road.

A proposed I-73 would incorporate US 127 between Jackson and Grayling. However, Michigan abandoned plans for build I-73 in 2001.

History

Southern terminus
US 127 originally terminated at Toledo when it was commissioned in 1926. At that time, the southern portion ran from Somerset to Toledo along the route of present-day U.S. Route 223. In 1930 the southern terminus moved to Cincinnati, and in 1958 it was extended to its present southern terminus at Chattanooga.

Northern terminus

The northern terminus of US 127 was in or near Lansing, Michigan, from its inception in 1926 to 2002. In 2002, the terminus was moved to an intersection with I-75 south of Grayling in Crawford County, Michigan, replacing all of US 27 north of Lansing.

Major intersections
Tennessee
  in Chattanooga
  in Crossville
  in Crossville
  in Crossville
Kentucky
  in Danville. The highways travel concurrently through Danville.
  northeast of Harrodsburg
  in Lawrenceburg
  in Frankfort
  in Frankfort
  in Frankfort. The highways travel concurrently through Frankfort.
  in Glencoe
  north-northeast of Glencoe.
  in Florence
  in Florence. The highways travel concurrently to the Ohio state line.
  in Crestview Hills
  in Fort Mitchell
  in Covington
Ohio
  in Cincinnati. The highways travel concurrently through Cincinnati.
  in Cincinnati
  in Cincinnati
  in Cincinnati
  in Cincinnati
  in Cincinnati
  on the Pleasant Run–Mount Healthy Heights–Forest Park line.
  in Eaton
  exit 10 Eaton, OH (4 miles south)
  west of Lewisburg
  west-northwest of Jaysville. The highways travel concurrently to Greenville.
  southeast of Rockford
  in Van Wert. US 127/US 224 travels concurrently to north-northeast of Van Wert.
  east of Cecil
  south of Bryan
  east of Alvordton. The highways travel concurrently to west of Fayette.
Michigan
  southeast of Somerset
  east of Somerset
  northeast of Jackson. The highways travel concurrently to north-northwest of Jackson.
  at Michigan State University south-southeast of Lansing. I-496/US 127 travels concurrently to East Lansing.
  north-northwest of East Lansing
  in Clare. The highways travel concurrently to north-northwest of Clare.
  south of Grayling

See also

References

External links

 Endpoints of US highway 127

 
1
27-1
Interstate 75